Davide Simoncini (born 30 August 1986) is a Sanmarinese footballer who plays as a defender for Sammarinese club Tre Fiori and captains the San Marino national team.

Club career 
Simoncini played for A.C. Libertas from 2005 until 2020, when he signed for S.P. Tre Fiori. He has enjoyed success at both clubs, winning the Coppa Titano twice with Libertas.

International career 
Simoncini made his debut for San Marino in 2006 in a friendly against Albania, coming on as a substitute. He is La Serenissima's third most capped player and the most capped player still active. 

Simoncini and his twin brother, Aldo, both scored an own goal each against Sweden on 7 September 2010, becoming the first twins to accomplish such a feat in an international competition.

References

External links
 

Sammarinese footballers
San Marino international footballers
1986 births
Living people
Sammarinese twins
Twin sportspeople
Campionato Sammarinese di Calcio players
Association football defenders